The Touch Book is a portable computing device that functions as a netbook, and a tablet computer. Designed by Always Innovating, a company situated in the city of Menlo Park, in California, USA, it was launched at the DEMO conference in March 2009. Its designers stated at launch that it is the first netbook featuring a detachable keyboard with a long battery life (more than 10 hours). It is based on the ARM TI OMAP3530 processor (taking advantage of the Beagleboard and existing open source software) and features a touchscreen.

First units to customers were shipped in August 2009. There were some (expected) software issues for early adopters, which are being progressively addressed. There were also some hardware issues, which resulted in community discontent.

After much speculation on the community forum, a revised v.2 Touch Book and new Smart Book product were announced. The Smart Book is based on the BeagleBoard-xM design.

Overview 

The Touch Book is a netbook and a touch tablet device. It features a detachable keyboard, a removable back cover to access the electronics of the device, and several Linux distributions shipped by default and offered via a multiboot system.

The default operating system launched is a custom Linux OS based on Ångström, being custom themed to fit the small form factor. Since 2010, the Touch Book comes with a multi-boot graphical interface, allowing users to run also Ubuntu and Android. Users can install other OSes like Gentoo and RISC OS.

Touch Book's major intended uses are media viewing and web browsing, although more power-hungry applications such as OpenOffice.org are available on the device. The Touch Book ships standard graphics libraries such as OpenGL ES and SDL.

The Always Innovating team claims the device follows an open hardware philosophy, so that anyone can access the hardware design from the company's website, modify it and redistribute it. Although the business model of open hardware is still maturing, it seems to be profitable to the company

In addition to this open hardware approach, the Touch Book fully relies on open source software. A Git repository of the entire OS is currently available, allowing for download of the latest kernel source as well as the different root file systems. A community of contributors has emerged and is interacting with the Always Innovating developers.

Technical specifications 
 ARM 600 MHz (overclocked to 720 MHz) Cortex-A8 superscalar microprocessor core: Texas Instruments OMAP3530 System-on-Chip
 512 MB DDR-333 SDRAM
 256 MB NAND FLASH memory
 DSP Core video processor at 430 MHz
 OpenGL ES 2.0 compliant
 Freescale-based 3D accelerometer
 Integrated Ralink-based Wi-Fi 802.11b/g/n
 Integrated Bluetooth 2.0
 1024x600 resolution touchscreen LCD, 8.9" widescreen, 16.7 million colors
 SDHC card slot (currently supporting up to 32 GB of storage)
 Headphone output, microphone input
 Standard QWERTY keyboard and touchpad
 USB 2.0 OTG port (480Mbit/s)
 6× USB 2.0 host ports (480 Mbit/s)
 JTAG debugging interface
 Runs the Linux kernel (2.6.x)
 Dual 12000mAh + 6000mAh rechargeable lithium polymer battery
 Estimated 10+ hour battery life for video and general applications
 Detachable magnet system for the tablet
 Dimensions: 248 mm × 158 mm × 19 mm for the tablet, 248 mm × 180 mm × 33.5 mm for the full netbook
 Mass: 675 g for the Tablet; 1,418 g for the full netbook

Similar products 
Other single-board computers using OMAP3500 series processors include OSWALD, Beagle Board, IGEPv2, Pandora and Gumstix Overo series. Since launch of the device in March 2009, several similar devices have come up in early 2010, such as the Freescale tablet reference design or the  Lenovo U1 IdeaPad.

References

External links 
 

RISC OS
Embedded Linux
Texas Instruments hardware
Linux-based devices
2-in-1 PCs